The Boston mayoral election of 1895 occurred on Tuesday, December 10, 1895. Democratic candidate Josiah Quincy defeated Republican candidate and incumbent Mayor of Boston Edwin Upton Curtis, and one other contender, to win election to his first term.

Due to a change of the city charter in June 1895, this was the first Boston mayoral election for a two-year term; prior mayoral elections had been held annually.

Quincy was inaugurated on Monday, January 6, 1896. His grandfather Josiah Quincy IV (known as Josiah Quincy Jr.) and great-grandfather Josiah Quincy III also had served as Mayors of Boston.

Candidates
 Edwin Upton Curtis (Republican), incumbent Mayor of Boston, former City Clerk of Boston (1889–1890)
 Frank Parsons (Municipal Reform), "lecturer on insurance at Boston University"—referred to as the candidate for the "municipal reform party", "a fusion of prohibitionists, labor, populists, and socialists" Parsons was a Populist.
 Josiah Quincy (Democrat), former member of the Massachusetts House of Representatives (1887–1888, 1890–1891), and United States Assistant Secretary of State (1893)

Results

See also
List of mayors of Boston, Massachusetts

References

Further reading
 

1895
Boston
Boston mayoral
19th century in Boston